Attulus finschi is a species of spider from the jumping spider family Salticidae. It is found in Russia, Canada, and the United States.

References

Sitticini
Spiders of North America
Spiders of Russia
Spiders described in 1879